Ufukcan Engin (born 8 March 1999) is a Turkish professional footballer who plays as a midfielder for Kırıkkale Büyük Anadoluspor.

Professional career
Engin is a youth product of Dardanel Spor A.Ş. and debuted professionally with them in 2014, and with them became the youngest scorer in the history of professional Turkish football. His goal debut came in a 1-1 TFF Third League tie with Payas Belediyespor 1975 on 18 October 2014, when Engin was 15.

On 12 August 2017, he signed with Fortuna Sittard in the Dutch Eerste Divisie. He made his debut in a 5-1 Eerste Divisie win over Jong PSV on 22 September 2017.

References

External links
 
 
 
 Fortuna Sittard Profile

1999 births
Sportspeople from Çanakkale
Living people
Turkish footballers
Turkey youth international footballers
Association football midfielders
Dardanelspor footballers
Fortuna Sittard players
İstanbulspor footballers
Nazilli Belediyespor footballers
Eerste Divisie players
TFF Third League players
Turkish expatriate footballers
Turkish expatriate sportspeople in the Netherlands
Expatriate footballers in the Netherlands